John Moulton may refer to:

John Fletcher Moulton, Baron Moulton, English mathematician, barrister and judge
John Egan Moulton, Australian medical practitioner
Jon Moulton, British venture capitalist